Tara spinosa, commonly known as tara (Quechua), also known as Peruvian carob or spiny holdback, is a small leguminous tree or thorny shrub native to Peru. T. spinosa is cultivated as a source of tannins based on a galloylated quinic acid structure. This chemical structure has been confirmed also by LC–MS. It is also grown as an ornamental plant because of its large colorful flowers and pods.

Names and taxonomy
Its common names include spiny holdback, tara, taya, and algarroba tanino (Peru).

Tara spinosa is placed in the family Fabaceae, subfamily Caesalpinioideae, and tribe Caesalpinieae.

Description
Leaves are alternate, evergreen, lacking stipules, bipinnate, and lacking petiolar and rachis glands. Flowers are yellow to orange with 6- to 7-mm petals; the lowest sepal is boat-shaped with many long marginal teeth; stamens are yellow, irregular in length and barely protruding.

Distribution and habitat
Tara spinosa is native to Peru and can be found growing throughout northern, western, and southern South America, from Venezuela to Argentina. It has been introduced in drier parts of Asia, the Middle East, and Africa and has become naturalized in California. T. spinosa grows in the nearly rainless lomas or fog oases of the Peruvian coastal desert.

Mature pods are usually harvested by hand and typically sun dried before processing. If well irrigated, trees can continue to produce for another 80 years, though their highest production is between 15 and 65 years of age.

Uses

Industrial
Tara spinosa pods are an excellent source of environmentally friendly tannins (tara tannins) most commonly used in the manufacture of automotive and furniture leathers. This growing industry is developing around their production in Peru. Some producers have their own plantations to guarantee constant quality. 

Tara tannin derivatives are being proposed as antifouling against marine organisms that can grow on ship hulls. Those tannins are of the hydrolysable type. Gallic acid is the main constituent of tara tannins (53%) and can be easily isolated by alkaline hydrolysis of the plant extract. 

Quinic acid is also a constituent of the tara tannins. Its tannines are colourless or light making them suitable a premordant in the dyeing of cotton and other cellulose fibres.

The tree can also be a source of lumber and firewood, and as a live fence.

The seeds can be used to produce black dye, while dark blue dye can be obtained from the roots.

Food additive
Tara gum is a white or beige, nearly odorless powder that is produced by separating and grinding the endosperm of T. spinosa seeds. Tara gum consists of a linear main chain of (1-4)-β-D-mannopyranose units attached by (1-6) linkages with α-D-galactopyranose units. The major component of the gum is a galactomannan polymer similar to the main components of guar and locust bean gums that are used widely in the food industry. The ratio of mannose to galactose in tara gum is 3:1. Tara gum has been deemed safe for human consumption as a food additive. 

Tara gum is used as a thickening agent and stabilizer in a number of food applications. A solution of tara gum is less viscous than a guar gum solution of the same concentration, but more viscous than a solution of locust bean gum. Furthermore, tara gum shows an intermediate acid stability between locust bean gum and guar gum. It resists the depolymerisation effect of organic acids down to a pH of 3.5. This gum is also stable to high-temperature treatment, up to 145 °C in a continuous process plant. Blends of tara with modified and unmodified starches can be produced which have enhanced stabilization and emulsification properties, and these are used in the preparation of convenience foods, such as ice cream. One example is the American ice cream brand Breyers. 

The European food additive number for tara gum is E417. Tara gum is listed on the Canadian List of Permitted Emulsifying, Gelling, Stabilizing or Thickening Agents (Lists of Permitted Food Additives) as item T.2B.

On July 19, 2022, the food company Daily Harvest identified tara flour as the ingredient that had sickened hundreds of its customers. A handful of lawsuits have been filed against the company.

Medicinal

Medicinal uses in Peru include gargling infusions of the pods for inflamed tonsils or washing wounds; it is also used for fevers, colds, and stomach aches. Water from boiled, dried pods is also used to kill fleas and other insects.

References

Caesalpinieae
Trees of Peru
E-number additives